Clive Caldwell: Air Ace is a 2006 book by Kristen Alexander. It is a biography of Clive Caldwell, the leading Australian flying ace of World War II.

References

History books about World War II
2006 non-fiction books